Elena Bodnarenco (5 March 1965 – 4 July 2022) was a Moldovan politician. A member of the Party of Communists of the Republic of Moldova, she served in the Parliament from 2005 to 2011, 2014 to 2019, and again from 2021 to 2022.

Bodnarenco died of cancer in Chișinău on 4 July 2022 at the age of 57.

References

1965 births
2022 deaths
Moldovan women
Party of Communists of the Republic of Moldova politicians
20th-century Moldovan politicians
21st-century Moldovan politicians
Moldovan MPs 2014–2018
Moldovan MPs 2005–2009
People from Soroca